Şahinler can refer to:

 Şahinler, Burhaniye
 Şahinler, Gülşehir
 Şahinler, Kemaliye

For the village in Cyprus called Şahinler in Turkish, see Masari.